Austin Hamlet (born 20 January 1979) is a former Nigerian footballer who spent the majority of his career in Poland.

Football

Hamlet started his career in Nigeria with Rangers International. In 1997 he moved to Poland after being convinced to move to the country by a friend, and spent the rest of his playing career in the country. He joined ŁKS Łódź playing a few games in their 1997–98 Ekstraklasa winning season. In total over three years, Hamlet made 36 league appearances and scored 3 goals. While contracted with ŁKS, Hamlet went on loan to three clubs; Piotrcovia Piotrków Trybunalski, Polonia Gdańsk, and Lechia-Polonia Gdańsk. During the summer of 2000 Hamlet joined Stomil Olsztyn in which would be the start in a series of short spells at different clubs. He spent time with Stal Stalowa Wola, returned to ŁKS Łódź, and played for Chojniczanka Chojnice before finishing off his career with Pelikan Łowicz after agreeing to leave the club in January 2004. In 2004 Hamlet had some issues related to his stay in the country. He left Poland and retired from football aged 24. After returning to Nigeria Hamlet focused on training youth players club academies.

Honours

ŁKS Łódź
Ekstraklasa: 1997–98

References

1979 births
Nigerian footballers
ŁKS Łódź players
Polonia Gdańsk players
Lechia Gdańsk players
OKS Stomil Olsztyn players
Stal Stalowa Wola players
Chojniczanka Chojnice players
Association football forwards
Living people
Sportspeople from Lagos